Metalrax was the main supplier of non-stick coated steel bakeware to the UK market, since the 1960s, and the trade (product) name of a series of manufacturing companies. It has been Europe's largest supplier of non-stick coated steel for the bakeware industry.

History
Metalrax was, historically, a Worcestershire company. By 1979, the company was formed of eighteen subsidiary companies, which made other types of non-bakeware industrial products. Its bakeware products were made of steel and aluminium.

Ownership
On Tuesday 17 March 1964, the company was listed on the London Stock Exchange as Metalrax (Holdings), through the amalgamation of four companies. Th company was incorporated on 27 February 1964. It became Metalrax Group in January 1982.

It was owned by Metalrax Group, which was bought out after it lost a main contract for a UK supermarket in July 2012, and had been listed on the Alternative Investment Market (AIM) from June 2008.

The company had a management buy-out in July 2017. Another division of the company, EWS a cold roll forming company for housing fenestration and the UK market leader, on the A449 south of M54 junction 2 was bought in July 2018.

Structure
CCC is the company, on the Steelpark Trading Estate in Wednesfield off the A4124, which makes non-stick coatings of steel.

Products
 Non-stick bakeware (coated with polytetrafluoroethylene, or PTFE)
 Wine racks
 Wooden and plastic housewares

References

External links
Grace's Guide
Aluminum Parts

Aluminium companies of the United Kingdom
British companies established in 1964
Companies formerly listed on the Alternative Investment Market
Companies formerly listed on the London Stock Exchange
Cookware and bakeware
Kitchenware brands
Manufacturing companies based in Wolverhampton
Manufacturing companies established in 1964
Steel companies of the United Kingdom